Greg Ray Theberge (born September 3, 1959) is a Canadian broadcaster and former professional ice hockey player. A defenceman, Theberge was drafted 109th overall in 1979 by the Washington Capitals.  He played his entire NHL career with the Capitals, also playing for their AHL farm team affiliate the Hershey Bears.

Theberge was born in Peterborough, Ontario. As a youth, he played in the 1972 Quebec International Pee-Wee Hockey Tournament with a minor ice hockey team from Peterborough. Theberge spent his OHL career with his hometown Peterborough Petes. His son, Brett, was member of the Petes. Theberge is the grandson of former NHL player and Hall of Famer Dit Clapper.

Theberge is currently the colour commentator for TVCogeco covering the North Bay Battalion, alongside play-by-play man Ranjan Rupal.

References

 1986-87 Augsburger Eishockey Verein (AEV) Germany/Bavaria http://www.aev-panther.de/start.html
 Picture: https://abload.de/img/gregthebergeubu5t.jpg

External links

1959 births
Canadian ice hockey defencemen
Ice hockey people from Ontario
Living people
Peterborough Petes (ice hockey) players
Sportspeople from Peterborough, Ontario
Washington Capitals draft picks
Washington Capitals players